Gaile Lai , born Lai Ga Yi on 22 August 1980, better known as Gaile Lok, is a Hong Kong actress and model. She was born in Macau to a Chinese father and a Vietnamese mother. Gaile studied in the United States.

Background
Gaile Lok is of Chinese-Vietnamese descent as her mother is Kinh Vietnamese. She was born in Macau but grew up in USA. She made her film debut starring in the 2000 romantic film, I Do, and subsequently appeared in another film entitled My Sweetie in 2004. When she made her debut, some Hong Kong entertainment information magazines had compared her likeness to that of Shu Qi, a Taiwanese actress. In 2005, she openly admitted to had performed breast augmentation surgery, but reverted shortly as they take too much load on the back.

Personal life
As of 2006, Gaile was dating Leon Lai, a Hong Kong actor and singer.  With this relationship, she became a target of paparazzi and the media. In 2006, a magazine published an article and intimate photographs of her with Leon Lai at the latter's residence, prompting the Hong Kong Actors Guild to protest "irresponsibility" on the part of the magazine.

In 2009, Lok and Lai were secretly married in Las Vegas at the Wynn Hotel, with his manager and assistant acting as witnesses.

On 3 October 2012 the couple announced the end of their four-year marriage. Their joint statement stated that there were "different philosophies in life" which caused the divorce. Leon Lai's manager stated that there was not a third party that lead the couple to divorce.

Lok married businessman Ian Chu in 2017. Their son, Hunter, was born on 29 April 2019.

References

External links
 

1980 births
Living people
20th-century Hong Kong actresses
21st-century Hong Kong actresses
20th-century Macau people
21st-century Macau people
Hong Kong female models
Hong Kong film actresses
Hong Kong people of Hoa descent
Hong Kong people of Vietnamese descent
Hong Kong television actresses
Macau-born Hong Kong artists